No. 2 Strip Milne Bay, (Waigani Airfield), was an aerodrome under construction near Waigani village, Milne Bay, Papua New Guinea during World War II as part of Naval Base Milne Bay.

Works at the aerodrome were discontinued due to the site being unsuitable for an aerodrome due to drainage problems.

References

Airports in Papua New Guinea
Papua New Guinea in World War II
Naval Base Milne Bay
Southern Region, Papua New Guinea
Airfields of the United States Navy
Military installations closed in the 1940s
Closed installations of the United States Navy
1942 establishments in the Territory of Papua